Titanoboa: Monster Snake is a 2012 documentary film produced by the Smithsonian Institution. The documentary treats Titanoboa, the largest snake ever found. Fossils of the snake were uncovered from the Cerrejón Formation at Cerrejón, the tenth biggest coal mine in the world in the Cesar-Ranchería Basin of La Guajira, northern Colombia, covering an area larger than Washington, D.C. The documentary premiered at the Smithsonian Channel on April 1, 2012, followed by a panel discussion from the scientists who spearheaded the research: Carlos Jaramillo from the Smithsonian Tropical Research Institute, Jonathan Bloch from the Florida Museum of Natural History and Jason Head from the University of Nebraska at Lincoln.

Description 

The documentary describes the finding of and scientific examination after Titanoboa. The tagline of the documentary is:
Meet Titanoboa: She's longer than a bus, eats crocodiles for breakfast and makes the anaconda look like a garter snake."

The documentary was released on March 28, 2012 at the Baird auditorium of the Smithsonian National Museum of Natural History.

Cast

 Jim Conrad (Narrator)
 Dr. Jonathan Bloch (himself)
 Edwin Cadena (himself)
 Percy Fawcett (archive photo)
 Alex Hastings (himself)
 Dr. Jason Head (himself)
 Shawn Heflick (himself)
 Fabiany Herrera (himself)
 Kevin Hockley (himself)
 Carlos Jaramillo (himself)
 P. David Polly (himself)
 Jesús Rivas (himself)

References

External links 
 Titanoboa: Monster Snake at the Smithsonian Channel
 

2012 television films
2012 films
2012 in paleontology
2012 documentary films
Documentary films about reptiles
Films about snakes
Cerrejón Formation
2010s English-language films